Scythris albiangulella is a moth of the family Scythrididae. It was described by Bengt Å. Bengtsson in 2002. It is found in Ethiopia, Kenya, Namibia, Tanzania and Yemen.

References

albiangulella
Moths described in 2002